Huemul may refer to:

 The South Andean deer
 Huemul Island (Isla Huemul)
 Huemul Project

See also
 Huemulite